The JH23 was a Formula One car built and raced by the AGS team for the 1988 Formula One season. It was powered by the Ford Cosworth DFZ engine. A single car was entered, driven by experienced Frenchman Philippe Streiff.

1988
The JH23 proved to be a good car for the small French team, in only their second full season in Formula One. The car managed to qualify for all 16 races including 12th at Monaco, and 10th in Canada where before retiring with suspension failure on lap 41, it was only the power of the Honda V6 turbo in Nelson Piquet's ill-handling Lotus 100T that kept Streiff from passing the reigning World Champion for 4th place. However whenever it got close to scoring points, the car broke down. Streiff only managed to finish 6 races, the best result being 8th at Suzuka.

1989
The car was updated with a Ford Cosworth DFR engine for the  season, to become the JH23B and for the first time the team entered two cars.

The drivers were Phillipe Streiff and the rookie German Joachim Winkelhock. The season got off to a tragic start as Streiff was seriously injured in a pre-season testing crash at the Jacarepaguá circuit in Brazil. This left him paralysed and thus using a wheelchair.

Italian Gabriele Tarquini took over from Streiff and had a good season, the highlight being a 6th place in Mexico. However his teammate Winkelhock and later on Yannick Dalmas failed to get past pre-qualifying.

By Spa the car was replaced by the JH24.

After Formula One

Three JH23 chassis were built, two are still owned by AGS and the other is on display at the Lohéac Automobile Museum. A JH23 chassis would take part in the Legends F1 30th Anniversary Lap, a demonstration event held during the 2018 Japanese Grand Prix to celebrate the 30th Japanese Grand Prix held at Suzuka.

Complete Formula One results
(key) (results in bold indicate pole position)

References

External links 
Profile at ChicaneF1
AGS F1 chassis listing

AGS Formula One cars